Ron Grove (5 June 1919 – 8 January 1993) was an Australian rules footballer who played with Geelong and Footscray.  Ron played in a number of positions throughout his career, although undoubtedly his best moment was in a 1946 game against Melbourne in which he kicked 10 goals. He started his career in 1941 playing for Geelong, although after receiving limited opportunity he moved to Footscray for the next season.

References 

 Holmesby, Russell & Main, Jim (2007). The Encyclopedia of AFL Footballers. 7th ed. Melbourne: Bas Publishing.

1919 births
1993 deaths
Australian rules footballers from Victoria (Australia)
Geelong Football Club players
Western Bulldogs players
Golden Point Football Club players